Đerić (also transliterated Djerić) is a Serbian surname. It may refer to:

 Radoje Đerić (born 1991), Serbian rower
 Uroš Đerić (born 1992), Serbian football player
 Zoran Đerić, Bosnian Serb politician

Serbian surnames